The Scarsdale Concours (d'Elegance) is an annual Concours d'Elegance (competitive auto show) that takes place in the center of the Town of Scarsdale, New York. It features over 100 exotic cars ranging from Ferrari to Rolls-Royce.  The show is a fundraiser for charity, helping organizations such as the  Paulie Strong Foundation and the Scarsdale Police Department as well as other local organizations from Westchester, and also Habitat for Humanity. Funds are generated from donations from sponsors, donations from participants and voluntary admission donations. Since 2004, the show has raised over $350,000 for charity. 

This auto show went on hiatus in 2020 and returned in 2021.

External links
 Scarsdale Concours site

Concours d'Elegance
Auto shows in the United States
Events in New York (state)
Scarsdale, New York